Daguannanlu station, is a station on Line 21 of the Guangzhou Metro. It opened on 20 December 2019 along with the western section of Line 21.

Station Layout
The station has an underground island platform. Platform 1 is for trains heading to Zengcheng Square, whilst platform 2 is for trains heading to Yuancun.

Exits
There are 2 exits, lettered A and B. Exit B is accessible. Both exits are located on Daguannan Road.

Gallery

References

Railway stations in China opened in 2019
Guangzhou Metro stations in Tianhe District